The Take is a 2007 American crime drama film directed by Brad Furman and starring John Leguizamo, Tyrese Gibson, Bobby Cannavale, and Rosie Perez. The plot concerns an armored-truck driver who survives a violent hijacking and becomes obsessed with tracking down his attackers. It was released on April 11, 2008.

Plot synopsis
Felix De La Pena (John Leguizamo) is a hardworking armored-truck driver, a loving husband to his wife Marina (Rosie Perez) and a caring father of two in Los Angeles's Boyle Heights neighborhood. After being abducted and shot in the head during a hijacking led by Adell Baldwin (Tyrese Gibson), Felix loses his memory, exhibits erratic post-trauma behavior, and is framed as a prime suspect for the crime. Since he cannot provide any leads to FBI agent Steve Perelli (Bobby Cannavale), Felix is forced to try to find his assailant by himself.

Cast
John Leguizamo as Felix De La Pena
Tyrese Gibson as Adell Baldwin
Bobby Cannavale as Agent Steve Perelli
Rosie Perez as Marina De La Pena

Production
Both John Leguizamo and Rosie Perez admitted sex scenes with them together felt uncomfortable because they are close friends and attend church together.

Reviews

References

External links

Toronto International Film Festival

2007 films
2007 crime drama films
American crime drama films
Films directed by Brad Furman
2007 directorial debut films
2000s English-language films
2000s American films